Vitali Anatolyevich Ushakov (born 12 September 1974) is a former Russian football player. He also holds Kazakhstani citizenship.

Honours
Atyrau
Kazakhstan Premier League runner-up: 2002

Taraz
Kazakhstan Cup winner: 2004

Aktobe
Kazakhstan Premier League champion: 2008
Kazakhstan Cup winner: 2008

References

1974 births
Sportspeople from Krasnodar
Living people
Soviet footballers
FC Olympik Kharkiv players
Russian footballers
FC Kuban Krasnodar players
Russian Premier League players
FC SKA Rostov-on-Don players
FC Taganrog players
FC Spartak Semey players
Russian expatriate footballers
Expatriate footballers in Kazakhstan
FC Atyrau players
FC Zhetysu players
FC Taraz players
FC Aktobe players
FC Vostok players
FC Kyzylzhar players
Kazakhstan Premier League players
FC Armavir players
Association football midfielders
FC Dynamo Vologda players